Peabody Municipal Light Plant (PMLP) is an American municipal electric utility company serving the citizens of Peabody, Massachusetts and some surrounding communities. The five-member Municipal Lighting Commission is responsible for the operations of PMLP, and its members are elected by the citizens of Peabody. PMLP was founded in 1891 following a protracted legal battle with surrounding jurisdictions.

The company was governed by an elected Municipal Board from 1902 to 1916. When Peabody became a city in 1916, the company was placed under the control of the Mayor, who appointed a Light Board to act in a advisory capacity. This form of governance was in place until November 6, 1951, when voters accepted a Massachusetts Statute which reinstated an elected Municipal Lighting Commission to independently oversee the operation of PMLP.

References

See also

 Electricity distribution companies by country
 List of United States electric companies
 Peabody, Massachusetts

Electric power distribution network operators
Peabody, Massachusetts
Energy in Massachusetts
Companies based in Peabody, Massachusetts